Sari Kuh Olya (also Romanized as Sarī Kūh Olyā; also known as Amid Ali (Persian: اميدعلي), also Romanized as Āmīd Alī) is a village in Zaz-e Sharqi Rural District, Zaz va Mahru District, Aligudarz County, Lorestan Province, Iran. At the 2006 census, its population was 73, in 15 families.

References 

Towns and villages in Aligudarz County